Rommel C. Amatong (born October 5, 1961) is a Filipino politician. A member of the LAKAS-CMD Party, he was elected as a Member of the House of Representatives of the Philippines, representing the Second District of Compostela Valley beginning in 2007. He succeeded his father, Prospero Amatong, who represented the same district from 1998 until his retirement in 2007. He is an engineer by profession.

References

Notes

Rommel
1961 births
Living people
People from Davao de Oro
Lakas–CMD (1991) politicians
Lakas–CMD politicians
Members of the House of Representatives of the Philippines from Davao de Oro